Jermelle Cudjo (born September 28, 1986) is an American football defensive tackle who is currently a free agent. He played college football at Central Oklahoma. He has played for the St. Louis Rams, Kansas City Chiefs and New York Giants.

Early years
Cudjo was a standout at Lawton MacArthur High School (Oklahoma). He was a Two-time Lawton Constitution All-Area pick and an All-State selection as a senior.

College career
At the University of Central Oklahoma Cudjo was a three-time All-Conference selection (twice First-team, once Second-team). He finished with 198 tackles (38.5 for losses) and 12 sacks.

As a freshman (2005) at the University of Central Oklahoma, Cudjo redshirted. In 2006 as a redshirt freshman he made 33 tackles with four for loss in 11 games played. He blocked a total of six kicks on the season while adding half of a sack and two fumble recoveries (one for a touchdown). In 2007, as a sophomore, Cudjo made 47 tackles, 6.5 tackles for loss, and had 3.5 sacks and was named First-team All-Lone Star North. In 2008, during his junior year, he broke through with 60 tackles, 15.5 for loss with 4.5 sacks and was named First-team All-Lone Star North. He followed that up with 58 tackles with 12.5 for loss and 3.5 sacks as a senior in 2009 and was voted as a Second-team All-Lone Star North.

After his senior season Cudjo played at the Cactus Bowl, the NCAA Division II All Star game in Kingsville, Texas.

Professional career

St. Louis Rams
Cudjo was signed as a free agent and made the Rams 53-man opening day roster. He was released on May 15, 2014.

Kansas City Chiefs
Cudjo signed with the Kansas City Chiefs during the 2014 offseason, but was released on August 25, 2014.

Detroit Lions
Cudjo signed with the Detroit Lions on January 9, 2015. Cudjo made the 53 man roster out of training camp.

New York Giants
On July 29, 2016, Cudjo signed with the Giants.
On September 3, 2016, he was released by the Giants.

References

External links

St. Louis Rams Bio

1986 births
Living people
Sportspeople from Lawton, Oklahoma
Players of American football from Oklahoma
American football defensive tackles
Central Oklahoma Bronchos football players
St. Louis Rams players
Kansas City Chiefs players
Detroit Lions players
New York Giants players